Hannah Collins (born May 6, 1997), professionally known as Scene Queen and formerly RØSÉ, is an American singer and songwriter signed to Hopeless Records. She is known for coining the style "Bimbocore", a subgenre of metalcore with feminist themes. She rose to fame on the social media platform TikTok, where she has garnered over 230,000 followers as of April 2022. Her debut EP Bimbocore was released on April 29, 2022. A followup EP, Bimbocore Vol. 2, was released on November 10, 2022.

Career
Hannah Collins grew up in Upstate New York and has lived in Alabama, Ohio, and currently lives in Los Angeles, California. Growing up, she and her older sister listened to emo bands such as My Chemical Romance and Brand New. In middle school, she ran a Tumblr blog and was a fan of scene bands such as Sleeping With Sirens, Pierce The Veil and metalcore bands such as The Ready Set. She originally intended to work on the administrative side of the music industry, hoping to land a job at Hopeless Records but decided against it. She left the scene movement in 2015 after feeling it had become misogynistic, focusing her songwriting on Pop, Hip-hop and Latin world but returned to the Alt movement where she encompassed all these genres into her music. She applied for internships at Hopeless Records 3 times. 

She self-released the single "Are You Tired?" in 2020, and signed with Hopeless Records in 2021. On March 3, 2022, Scene Queen released the song "Pink Rover", a song about the objectification of women and street harassment. On April 19, 2022, she announced that her debut EP Bimbocore would be released on April 29, 2022, alongside the single "Pink Panther". 

Of her creative process, she said "Before writing Bimbocore I felt like if I wasn’t exactly the way the rock industry wanted me to be I would never make it. It’s through this project that I’ve been able to pull myself out of that space and be unapologetically myself. I wrote this EP to be hyper-feminine and over the top because women have spent far too long making themselves small for other people's comfort. I realized that the louder I am and the more out of the box I get, the bigger the box gets, and the more room there is for other women to get inside it."

On July 15, 2022, Scene Queen released the lead single from her second EP, "Pink G-String". The EP's second single, "Barbie & Ken", is a collaboration with American punk band Set It Off. The song was released on August 25, 2022. Scene Queen's second EP, titled Bimbocore Vol. 2, was released on November 10, 2022, along with the single "Pink Hotel".

Musical style
Scene Queen defines her music as "bimbocore", a subgenre of metalcore, alternative rock and pop that "blends the reclaimed hyperfeminine aesthetics and vocal distortions of genres like pop with metalcore-inspired breakdowns". Her music has been described by Kerrang! as "a jagged jigsaw of clashing sounds, combining ferocious walls of djent guitar, and thumping trap beats that come together to create a seething harshness that will draw in fans of everyone from Ghostemane to Ashnikko and Kesha."

Her song "Pretty in Pink" blends screamo vocals with nursery rhyme melodies, while "Pink Panther" is an alt-pop track that samples "The Pink Panther Theme" with lyrics about girl-on-girl lust. Her fashion style is inspired by Y2K fashion style icons like Paris Hilton and Nicole Ritchie, with blonde hair and hot pink clothes.

Personal life
Collins has ADHD and bipolar disorder. She is bisexual and has said that her song "Pink Panther", which features themes of attraction to women, helped her come out.

Discography

Extended plays

Singles

Music videos

References

Hopeless Records artists
21st-century American women singers
21st-century American singers
American alternative rock musicians
American TikTokers
LGBT TikTokers
American LGBT musicians
LGBT people from Ohio
21st-century LGBT people
Bisexual women
Bisexual musicians
Living people
1997 births